Vinayaka, or Ganesha, is the Hindu god of new beginnings, success, and wisdom.

Vinayaka may also refer to:

 Vinayakas, a group of four demons in Hindu mythology
 Kangiten, the Japanese Buddhist elephant-headed god

See also
 
 Vinayak (Dallekh), Dallekh], Sudurpashchim Province, Nepal
 Vinayakan, Indian film actor and music composer
 Vinayakudu (film), a 2008 Telugu film 
 Ashtavinayaka, Ganesha temples in Maharashtra, India